The 2013 Blues season will be the team's 18th season in the Super Rugby competition. The Blues' pre-season began on February 2, and the regular season began on February 23. The team played 16 regular season matches, with byes in rounds 5 and 10. They did not play in rounds 1 and 17, which was only be contested by Australian teams as a result of the 2013 British & Irish Lions tour to Australia. The Blues played all teams within the New Zealand conference twice, and all other teams once, with the exception of the Western Force and Southern Kings. The 2013 team was captained by Ali Williams and coached by Sir John Kirwan.

Pre-season

The first of three pre-season fixtures was on the 2nd of February against the Queensland Reds in Toowoomba. This was followed by a home match against the New South Wales Waratahs at Toll Stadium on February 9 and a final match on February 15 against the Highlanders at Queenstown Events Centre.

Fixtures

Regular season

The Blues regular season will begin on February 23 with an away fixture against the Hurricanes, and will finish on July 13, with a home fixture against the Chiefs.

Fixtures

Tour Matches
On the 4th of April it was announced that the Blues would play a one-off match against France as a midweek fixture during their tour of New Zealand in June. The match was held on June 11 at North Harbour Stadium and was the first time a New Zealand-based Super Rugby team has played against an international side.

Player Summary
Player statistics through round five of the 2013 Super Rugby season are shown below:

Overall Summary

Legend: Apps. = Appearances, Cons. = Conversions, Pens. = Penalties, Drps. = Drop Goals, Pts. = Total points, W.C. = White cards, Y.C. = Yellow cards, R.C. = Red cards

Top Point Scorers

Top Try Scorers

Standings

The standings through the final round of the 2013 season are shown below:

<small>

Source: sanzarrugby.com
 Legend: Pos = Position, Rnd = Round, W = Win, D = Draw, L = Loss, PF = Points For, PA = Points Against, PD = Points Difference, TB = Four-try bonus points, LB = Close loss bonus points, Pts = Competition Points

Round by Round Result Summary

 Legend: H = Home, A = Away, W = Win, D = Draw, L = Loss, B = Bye, Pos = Position, Conf = Conference

See also
2013 Super Rugby season

External links
 Blues website
 Official SANZAR Super Rugby website
 Official New Zealand Super Rugby website

References

2013
2013 in New Zealand rugby union
2013 Super Rugby season by team